Terol is a surname. Notable people with the surname include:

 Joost Terol (born 1980), Dutch football goalkeeper
 Nicolás Terol (born 1988), Spanish motorcycle road racer

See also
 Tero (given name)